Benipur  is a village in Chanditala II community development block of Srirampore subdivision in Hooghly district in the Indian state of West Bengal.

Geography
Chanditala police station serves this Village.

Gram panchayat
Villages and census towns in Chanditala gram panchayat are: Bamandanga, Benipur, Chanditala, Kalachhara and Pairagachha.

Demographics
As per 2011 Census of India, Benipur had a total population of 1,161 of which 585 (50%) were males and 576 (50%) were females. Population below 6 years was 101. The total number of literates in Benipur was 941 (88.77% of the population over 6 years).

Transport
The nearest railway stations are Gobra railway station and Janai Road railway station on the Howrah-Bardhaman chord line, which is a part of the Kolkata Suburban Railway system.

References 

Villages in Chanditala II CD Block